Garry R. Smith (born March 4, 1957) is an American politician. He served as a member of the South Carolina House of Representatives from the 27th District from 2003 to 2022. He is a member of the Republican Party. He is also a professor of Political Science at North Greenville University.

References

Living people
1957 births
Republican Party members of the South Carolina House of Representatives
People from Aiken, South Carolina
21st-century American politicians